Nihar Ranjan Laskar (1 May 1932) was an Indian politician. He was elected to the Lok Sabha the lower house of Indian Parliament from Karimganj, Assam in 1962,1967,1971,1977 and 1980.He was member of the Indian National Congress.

References

External links
 Official Biographical Sketch in Lok Sabha Website

1932 births
Lok Sabha members from Assam
India MPs 1962–1967
India MPs 1967–1970
India MPs 1971–1977
India MPs 1977–1979
India MPs 1980–1984
People from Cachar district
Living people
Indian National Congress politicians from Assam